Calosoma antinorii is a species of ground beetle in the subfamily of Carabinae. It was described by Gestro in 1878.

References

antinorii
Beetles described in 1878